Peter Gordon (born 13 December 1963) is a retired South African football (soccer) defender who played for Wits University during his entire 13-year professional career. He holds the record for most goals and matches for Wits.

International career
He played his only international match in a 4-0 loss against Nigeria in a Group D World Cup qualifier after coming in for Lucas Radebe in the 75th minute.

References

1963 births
Living people
South African people of British descent
Association football defenders
South African soccer players
Bidvest Wits F.C. players
White South African people
South Africa international soccer players